is a brand of instant ramen noodles, cup noodles, and Yakisoba produced by Toyo Suisan of Tokyo, Japan. The Maruchan brand is used for noodle products in Japan, and as the operating name for Toyo Suisan's division in the United States, Maruchan Inc. In 1972, Toyo Suisan entered the American market with Maruchan USA, and in 1977, established a plant in Irvine, California. Maruchan has other plants in Richmond, Virginia, and one in Bexar County, Texas. Maruchan produces over 3.6 billion packages of ramen noodle soup a year. In the United States and  Mexico, Maruchan ramen is widely popular.

History

Toyo Suisan Kaisha, Ltd of Tokyo, Japan, founded on March 28, 1953, is a consumer packaged foods company in Japan. Toyo Suisan's effort to become an international food company brought them to the United States, where, in 1972, they established Maruchan USA. At first, Maruchan USA was only a marketing company, importing and distributing ramen from Japan. After operating for five years as a distributor of imported products, Maruchan built its own manufacturing facility in Irvine, California, in 1977, where it began producing Maruchan brand ramen. Since 1977 Maruchan has grown steadily and has become an industry leader in North America, alongside other instant noodle brands such as Top Ramen and Sapporo Ichiban.

Name
Maruchan is a Japanese word composed of two parts, maru and chan. Maru means round, as in the shape of a ball or a happy child's face. In Japanese, round has a connotation of friendliness. The word chan is an honorific suffix, used affectionately for a child or as a term of endearment.

See also
List of instant noodle brands

References

Companies based in Tokyo
Japanese brand foods
Japanese noodles
Food and drink companies of Japan
Instant noodle brands
Food and drink companies established in 1972
Japanese companies established in 1972

es:Maruchan
ja:東洋水産